Shahran Goraz (Persian: شهران‌گراز) is a character in Shahnameh. he is father of Hormizd and he approbated with coronation of Bahram Chobin.

See also
Shahrbaraz

References 

Shahnameh characters